A list of films produced in the Soviet Union between 1960 and 1969:

1960s
Soviet films of 1960
Soviet films of 1961
Soviet films of 1962
Soviet films of 1963
Soviet films of 1964
Soviet films of 1965
Soviet films of 1966
Soviet films of 1967
Soviet films of 1968
Soviet films of 1969

Soviet
Films